The Mariner oilfield is located in the United Kingdom sector of the North Sea, about  east of the Shetland Islands, Scotland, in block 9/11a. Estimated recovery is at least  of oil. 

As of December 2012 the operator, Statoil, has made the investment decision and final approval of the field development plan by the UK authorities is in progress. The plan envisages a production, drilling and quarters platform based on a conventional steel jacket, exporting oil via a floating storage unit. The oil is heavy and viscous, with API gravities of 12.1°–14.6° and viscosities ranging from 67cp in the field's Maureen reservoir to 508cp in the Heimdal reservoir. The small volume of associated gas will be used as fuel for the platform, and more fuel gas will be imported via a connection to the nearby Vesterled pipeline.

Ownership
Statoil acquired the operatorship from Chevron in 2007 and now has a 65.1% stake. JX Nippon has 20% interest and Alba Resources (subsidiary of Cairn Energy) has 6%.

References
Statoil makes investment decision for the Mariner project – Statoil press release, 21 December 2012
Statoil’s Mariner project will be largest in North Sea for a decade, The Scotsman, 22 December 2012

Equinor oil and gas fields
North Sea oil fields
Oil and gas industry in Scotland
Oil fields of Scotland